The Tomb of Hilarus Fuscus(Latin: Hilarus Fuscus or Hilarius Fuscus) is a funerary monument located near the fourth mile of the Appian Way or Via Appia Antica, to the southeast of Rome.

History
The tomb was restored by Luigi Canina in the mid-1800s. An inscription bearing the names of those represented on the masonry disappeared in the period between 1978 and 1998. The sculptures are copies: the originals are now in the National Museum of the Baths of Diocletian.

Architecture
The architecture of the tomb and the analysis of figures (particularly the  hairstyle of the women) suggests the tomb was built at end of the Republican period, the beginning of the Imperial age (circa 30 BC).

The tomb is mentioned in the Émile Zola novel Roma published in 1896.

References

External links

 Raccolta di foto di resti romani su Roma Interactive
 

Ancient Roman tombs and cemeteries in Rome